In cathode-ray tube (CRT), or computer display terminology, a triad is a group of 3 phosphor dots coloured red, green, and blue on the inside of the CRT display of a computer monitor or television set. By directing differing intensities of electron beams onto the 3 phosphor dots, the triad will display a colour by combining the red, green and blue elements. However, triads are not pixels, and multiple triads will form one logical pixel of the displayed image.

In liquid-crystal display (LCD), colours are similarly composed of these 3 fundamental colours.

See also
 Pixel
 Subpixel rendering
 Shadow mask
 Aperture grille

Display technology
3 (number)